Kureishi is a Pakistani surname. Notable people with the surname include:

Hanif Kureishi (born 1954), British playwright, screenwriter, filmmaker, and novelist 
Omar Kureishi (1928–2005), Pakistani writer
Maki Kureishi (1927–1995), Pakistani poet

See also
 List of people with surname Qureshi

Surnames of Pakistani origin